Molly's Game is a 2017 American biographical crime drama film written and directed by Aaron Sorkin (in his directorial debut), based on the 2014 memoir of the same name by Molly Bloom. It stars Jessica Chastain, Idris Elba, Kevin Costner, Michael Cera, Jeremy Strong, Chris O'Dowd, Joe Keery, Brian D'Arcy James, and Bill Camp.

The film follows Bloom (Chastain), who becomes the target of an FBI investigation after the underground poker empire she runs for Hollywood celebrities, athletes, business tycoons, and the Russian mob is exposed.

Principal photography began in November 2016 in Toronto, Ontario, Canada. The film premiered on September 8, 2017, at the Toronto International Film Festival, and began a limited theatrical release in the United States on December 25, 2017, by STX Entertainment, before expanding wide on January 5, 2018, and grossed $59 million worldwide.

Molly's Game received positive reviews, with particular praise for Sorkin's screenplay, as well as Chastain and Elba's performances, with the former being considered one of the best of her career by some critics. The film earned Chastain a Golden Globe nomination for Best Actress – Drama, while Sorkin earned nominations for his screenplay at the Academy Awards, Golden Globes, Writers Guild of America Awards, and BAFTA Awards.

Plot

Molly Bloom is a world-class mogul skier with Olympic aspirations, thanks to years of enforced training from her overbearing father. In a qualifying event for the 2002 Winter Olympics, she is severely injured, ending her career.

Instead of attending law school immediately, Molly takes a year off and moves to LA. Becoming a bottle service waitress at a club, she soon meets Dean, an ostentatious but unsuccessful real estate developer. She becomes his office manager, and is soon involved in running his underground poker games at "The Cobra Lounge". Many famous and wealthy individuals, including movie stars, investment bankers, and sports players, are involved in Dean's game. Molly earns large sums of money in tips alone.

Initially unfamiliar with poker, Molly quickly learns how to appeal to the players for tips. In particular, she hopes to please the most successful player, a film star named Player X, by attracting new players to the game. Dean, upon seeing that Molly is becoming increasingly independent in running the games, attempts to control, and then fires her.

Molly, having contacts through years of running the game, creates her own poker games. She rents a hotel penthouse and hires a staff. Additionally, she contacts club and casino employees to spread the word about her games.

Player X, along with many others, leaves Dean's games to play at Molly's. Increasingly successful, as Molly gains more money she is pressured by Player X to raise the stakes. Harlan Eustice, a skilled, conservative, and successful player, joins Molly's game.

One night, after accidentally losing a hand to the notoriously worst player, Brad Marion, Harlan becomes increasingly compulsive, suffering heavy losses (later, Molly finds out that Player X, who enjoys ruining people's lives more than the game itself, has been funding him to keep him playing). After Molly berates him for his unethicality, Player X decides to change venue for his games, and the others join him, leaving Molly.

Molly moves to NYC to begin a new underground poker game. After reaching out to many wealthy New Yorkers, Molly finds enough players for several weekly games.

Despite continuous success, she fears being unable to cover her losses when players cannot pay. Her dealer convinces her to begin taking a percentage of large pots, recouping her potential losses but making her game an illegal gambling operation.

Brad is indicted for running a Ponzi scheme; Molly is investigated and questioned as to who attended her games. At this time, she becomes increasingly addicted to drugs, as the games have taken their toll. Her players also begin to include wealthy individuals from the Russian mafia, among others.

Molly is approached by the Italian mafia, who offer their services to extort money from non-paying players. After she declines, she is attacked in her home, held at gunpoint and her mother's life is threatened. As she is about to return to her poker games, the FBI raids, as Douglas Downey, a player infatuated with her, informs on her. Molly's assets are seized, and she returns home to live with her mother.

Two years later, Molly has published a book, naming only a few individuals that played in her games. Arrested by the FBI, she is indicted for involvement in illegal gambling with the mafia. She enlists Charlie Jaffey's help, a high-profile, expensive lawyer in New York, who agrees to help after learning she has been protecting innocent people affected by her poker games.

While she is in NYC awaiting trial, her father Larry seeks her out and attempts to reconcile. He admits he was overbearing and that he treated Molly differently than her brothers because she had known about his affairs.

Charlie reads Molly's book and becomes interested in helping her case, as he feels she has not committed serious enough wrongdoing to merit prison. Charlie negotiates a deal for Molly to receive no sentence and for her money to be returned in exchange for her hard drives and digital gambling records. Molly declines this deal, fearing that the information about her players would be released, and she pleads guilty.

The judge, deciding that she had committed no serious crimes, sentences her to 200 hours community service, one year probation, and a $200,000 fine.

Cast

Production

Development

On November 12, 2014, Mark Gordon's The Mark Gordon Company bought the feature film adaptation rights to Molly Bloom's memoir, Molly's Game, which Gordon produced. Aaron Sorkin was hired to adapt the memoir into a screenplay. Bloom had already approached Sorkin, as he was her "favorite writer". On January 7, 2016, it was announced that Sorkin would make his directorial debut on the film, for Sony Pictures Entertainment, while Amy Pascal also produced. On February 18, 2016, Sony exited the project, and on May 13, 2016, STX Entertainment came on board, and subsequently bought the film's US and Chinese distribution rights for $9 million.

Casting
On February 18, 2016, Sorkin offered Jessica Chastain the lead role in the film, but the negotiations between them had then not yet begun. On May 6, 2016, Idris Elba joined the film to star alongside Chastain. Sorkin stated that "the casting of Jessica and Idris in the two lead roles is any filmmaker's dream come true, they're two of the greatest actors of their generation, paired for the first time, and their chemistry will be electric." On September 7, 2016, Michael Cera joined the cast as Player X, a celebrity poker player. On October 17, 2016, Kevin Costner joined as Molly Bloom's father, and on October 21, 2016, Brian d'Arcy James was added. On November 9, 2016, Chris O'Dowd, Jeremy Strong, Bill Camp, and Graham Greene joined the cast as well.

Molly Bloom herself discussed Chastain's portrayal of her character with ET Canada stating, "We spent a little time together. She didn't have much time for prep or research," Bloom told ET Canada's Matte Babel. "I was blown away by her performance by how right it was and how deep and understood I felt by her performance."

Filming
Principal photography began on November 9, 2016, in Toronto. Production concluded on February 9, 2017.

Release
Molly's Game premiered on September 8, 2017, at the Toronto International Film Festival. It was also the closing film at AFI Fest on November 16, 2017, replacing All the Money in the World. It began a limited release in North America on December 25, 2017, before expanding wide on January 5, 2018. The film was previously slated to be released on November 22, 2017, before being moved to the Christmas date in October 2017.

Reception

Box office
Molly's Game grossed $28.8 million in the United States and Canada, and $30.5 million in other territories, for a worldwide total of $59.3 million.

On Christmas Day, the film debuted with $1.04 million from 271 theaters. In its first full weekend, the film grossed $2.3 million, finishing 13th at the box office. The film expanded wide on January 5, 2018, alongside the opening of Insidious: The Last Key, and was projected to gross around $6 million from 1,608 theaters in its opening weekend. It ended up debuting to $6.9 million, finishing 7th at the box office. The following weekend it dropped 44% to $3.9 million, finishing 11th. In its third week of wide release the film grossed $1.7 million, finishing 19th.

The film also grossed a total of $4.5 million in France and $5.3 million in the United Kingdom.

Critical response
On review aggregator Rotten Tomatoes, the film has an approval rating of 82% based on 309 reviews, with an average rating of 7.10/10. The website's critical consensus reads, "Powered by an intriguing story and a pair of outstanding performances from Jessica Chastain and Idris Elba, Molly's Game marks a solid debut for writer-director Aaron Sorkin." On Metacritic, the film has a weighted average score of 71 out of 100, based on 46 critics, indicating "generally favorable reviews". Audiences polled by CinemaScore gave the film an average grade of "A−" on an A+ to F scale.

Peter Debruge of Variety praised Sorkin's script, saying, "... Molly's Game delivers one of the screen's great female parts — a dense, dynamic, compulsively entertaining affair, whose central role makes stunning use of Chastain's stratospheric talent." Mike Ryan of Uproxx gave the film 9/10, writing, "Molly's Game is a perfect story for Sorkin. There's poker, the Russian mafia, the Italian mafia, celebrities, and sports. The only thing missing for Sorkin's wheelhouse is President Bartlet. And at over two hours long, the film still feels tight and never fails to entertain."

Writing for Rolling Stone, Peter Travers gave the film 3 out of 4 stars, saying, "Molly's Game bristles with fun zingers, electric energy and Sorkin's brand of verbal fireworks – all of which help enormously when the movie falters in fleshing out its characters. Still, in his first film with a female protagonist, the writer-director has hit on a timely theme: the tribulations of being a woman in a man's world." Chastain's portrayal of Molly Bloom was praised by The Hollywood Reporter, for "Chastain roars through the performance with a force and take-no-prisoners attitude that keeps one rapt." The Hollywood Reporter also stated: "Sorkin keeps things rolling relentlessly and gets fine results from the actors down the line [...]. [...] The film looks sharp and a trio of editors keeps thing pacey despite the 140-minute running time." It concluded: "One strong woman and many rich men make for a good show."

Accolades

References

External links

 
 
 
 
 Molly's Game at History vs. Hollywood

2017 films
2017 biographical drama films
2017 crime drama films
American biographical drama films
American crime drama films
Crime films based on actual events
Drama films based on actual events
Entertainment One films
Scanbox Entertainment films
Films based on biographies
Films directed by Aaron Sorkin
Films with screenplays by Aaron Sorkin
Films produced by Amy Pascal
Films scored by Daniel Pemberton
Films set in Los Angeles
Films set in New York City
Films shot in New York City
Films shot in Toronto
Films shot in Utah
American nonlinear narrative films
Films about poker
STX Entertainment films
2017 directorial debut films
Films about the Russian Mafia
2010s English-language films
2010s American films